was a Japanese samurai of the early Edo period who served as daimyō of Wakayama Domain, and was later transferred to the Hiroshima Domain.

Biography
Born Asano Iwamatsu, he was the son of Asano Nagamasa, who was a senior retainer of Toyotomi Hideyoshi. In 1594, Nagaakira was made a retainer of Toyotomi Hideyoshi, and awarded a stipend of 3,000 koku. Allying his forces to Tokugawa Ieyasu six years later at the Battle of Sekigahara, he was subsequently awarded with the 24,000 koku Ashimori Domain. As his brother Yukinaga died heirless in 1613, Nagaakira succeeded him, becoming daimyō of Wakayama Domain. At the Siege of Ōsaka, he commanded a portion of Tokugawa Ieyasu's army. In the summer of 1615, Toyotomi Hideyori's Western Army moved to attack Asano's castle at Wakayama. Though most of Asano's forces were at Ōsaka, besieging Toyotomi's fortress, the remaining garrison outnumbered the Western warriors, and Asano led his men in sallying forth to meet the enemy in the Battle of Kashii.

Asano also fought in the Battle of Tennōji, the decisive final battle in the Siege of Ōsaka, where he commanded Tokugawa's rear guard. In 1619, he was granted the lordship of Hiroshima Domain in Aki Province, which would be the home of the Asano family until the Meiji Restoration. Nagaakira was married to Furihime, the widow of Gamō Hideyuki and third daughter of Tokugawa Ieyasu.

Family
 Father: Asano Nagamasa
 Mother: Cho-Sei-in (d.1616), daughter of Asano Nagakatsu
 Wife: Furihime (1580-1617), third daughter of the shōgun Tokugawa Ieyasu
 Children:
 Asano Nagaharu (1614-1675)
 Asano Mitsuakira by Furihime

References

Further reading
Turnbull, Stephen (1998). The Samurai Sourcebook. London: Cassell & Co.

|-

|-

Daimyo
Samurai
1586 births
1632 deaths
Asano clan
Deified Japanese people